Numerous theoretical accounts of memory have differentiated memory for facts and memory for context.  Psychologist Endel Tulving (1972; 1983) further defined these two declarative memory conceptions of explicit memory (in which information is consciously registered and recalled) into semantic memory wherein general world knowledge not tied to specific events is stored and episodic memory involving the storage of context-specific information about personal experiences (i.e. time, location, and surroundings of personal knowledge). Conversely, implicit memory (non declarative) involves perhaps unconscious registration (lack of awareness during encoding), yet definite unconscious recollection.  Skills and habits, priming, and classical conditioning all utilize implicit memory.

An essential aspect of episodic memory includes date and time encoding in the subject's past.  For such processing, the details surrounding the memory (where, when, and with whom the experience took place) must be preserved and are necessary for an episodic memory to form, otherwise the memory would be semantic.  For instance, one may possess an episodic memory of John F. Kennedy's assassination, including the fact that he was watching Walter Cronkite announce that Kennedy had been murdered.  However, if the contextual details of this event were lost, remaining would be a semantic memory that John F. Kennedy was assassinated.  The ability to recall episodic information concerning a memory has been termed source monitoring, and is subject to distortion that may lead to source amnesia.

References 
 Johnson, Hashtroudi, & Lindsay (1993) Source monitoring.  Psychological Bulletin.  114, (1), 3-28.

Memory